Patrick Alavi is a German musician and DJ specialising in funk and electronic.

Career

History

In 1996, Alavi released his first EP as Dj Alavi on Sonic House, a Sub Label of the German Techno Label Atomic Silence.

In 2001, Alavi was signed by Bad Boy Bill for his labels Moody Recordings and International House Records.

That same year Alavi signed 2 EP's on the French label Vertigo on which also Romain Tranchart from Modjo released his first EP as Funk Legacy.

In 2004, Kris Menace signed Alavi for two EP's on his Label Work It Baby. The track "Power" later was re-released in the UK with new mixes on Azuli Records.
The track "Come To Me" reached No. 3 in the UK Buzz Charts.

In 2005, Alavi founded his own label called Roxour on which he released music by Benjamin Theves ( "Texas" licensed to Kitsuné with a Remix by SebastiAn), Tepr ("En Direct De La Côte" licensed to Wall of Sound (record label) with a Remix by DatA), Flairs and others.

In the same year his track "The End" peaked at No. 1 in the Uk Buzz Charts presented on Pete Tong's Radioshow on BBC Radio 1.

In 2007, his track "Gotta Move" under the project name "Turbofunk" (released on Data Records in the UK and N.E.W.S. Records in the Benelux) reached No. 79 in the Dutch Singles Charts and No.1 in the UK Buzz & Hype Charts. The track contains a sample of "Dancing in the Street" by Peter Jacques band.

Remixes

In addition to his own material Alavi has created official remixes for Artists such as Gossip, Shinichi Osawa and Laidback Luke.

Compilations

His tracks have appeared on Compilations by Ministry of Sound, Modular, Hed Kandi, Virgin, Universal Records, Kontor and many other labels worldwide.

Support

Alavi has received radio airplay from DJs such as Pete Tong, Annie Mac, Kissy Sellout, Rob Da Bank, Zane Lowe, Fergie, Scott Mills, Dave Pearce and Judge Jules.

Inspiration

Alavi has also influenced other Djs and Producers, especially with his basslines.

References

External links 
 
 Patrick Alavi on Soundcloud

Funk musicians
German electronic musicians
Living people
Year of birth missing (living people)